Evan Bogart (born January 23, 1978), better known as E. Kidd Bogart, is an American songwriter, music publisher, record executive and film & television producer. He is the son of Casablanca Records founder Neil Bogart and former music manager Joyce Bogart Trabulus (KISS). Bogart's music has been nominated for three Grammy Awards, winning one (Beyoncé’s “Halo”), and he currently serves as National Trustee for The Recording Academy and Chair of their Songwriters & Composers Wing.

Discography (Alphabetical)

Songs Written by Evan "Kidd" Bogart
Adam Lambert – For Your Entertainment
"Broken Open"
"Down The Rabbit Hole" (iTunes bonus track)
Annabel Jones - Libelle
"Magnetic"
Ashley Tisdale – Headstrong
"He Said She Said"
Augustana – Augustana
"On The Other Side"
Beyoncé – I Am... Sasha Fierce
"Halo"
"Hello"
Becky G - No Drama
"No Drama" (featuring Ozuna)
Big Time Rush – Big Time Rush
"I Know You Know" (featuring Cymphonique)
Big Time Rush – Elevate
"If I Ruled The World" (featuring Iyaz)
Blake Lewis – A.D.D. (Audio Day Dream)
"Surrender"
Brandy – Human
"Right Here (Departed)"
Bridgit Mendler – Hello My Name Is...
"Ready Or Not"
"Forgot To Laugh"
"Hurricane"
"The Fall Song"
"Rocks At My Window"
Britney Spears – Blackout
"Everybody"
Britney Spears – Glory
"Love Me Down"
Bülow
"You & Jennifer"
"You & Jennifer (The Other Side)" featuring Rich the Kid
Carly Rae Jepsen - E*MO*TION
"Black Heart"
Class Actress - Movies
"More Than You"
"The Limit"
"High on Love"
"GFE"
"Love My Darkness"
"Movies"
The Cheetah Girls – TCG
"Fuego"
"Do No Wrong"
The D.E.Y. – The DEY Has Come
"Give You the World"
"Dame Un Memento"
Demi Lovato – Here We Go Again
"Got Dymanite"
Demi Lovato – Demi
"I Hate You, Don't Leave Me" 
 DJ Vice – Piñata
 "Piñata" feat. BIA, Kap G and Justin Quiles
Donna Summer – Crayons
"Mr. Music"
"The Queen Is Back"
Emblem3 – "Nothing To Lose
"Girl Next Door"
"Teenage Kings"
Enrique Iglesias – Euphoria
"Dirty Dancer" feat. Usher
"Why Not Me?"
"Dirty Dancer remix" feat. Usher and Lil Wayne
Fantasia – Side Effects of You
"Lighthouse"
Fleur East - Love, Sax & Flashbacks
"Love Me or Leave Me Alone"
Girls' Generation - Girls' Generation
"You-aholic"
Heidi Montag – Body Language
"Body Language"
Hey Violet – Brand New Moves
"Pure"
Hilary Duff – Best of Hilary Duff
"Reach Out"
Hot Chelle Rae – Whatever
"Tonight Tonight"
"I Like It Like That" feat. New Boyz
"Radio"
"Beautiful Freaks"
Jada – Bring It On: In It to Win It
"I'm That Chick"
Jason Derülo – Jason Derülo
"The Sky's The Limit"
"Fallen"
"Encore"
Jason Derülo – Future History
"It Girl"
Jennifer Lopez – Brave
"Stay Together"
Jennifer Lopez – Love?
"Until It Beats No More"
Jesse McCartney – Departure
"My Baby"
Jessi Malay – Jessi Malay
"Gimme" (featuring Lil Scrappy)
"Draw The Line"
Jessica Mauboy – Get 'Em Girls
"Scariest Part"
Jessica Simpson – VH1's Price of Beauty
"Who We Are"
K'naan – Country, God or the Girl
"Hurt Me Tomorrow"
Keke Palmer – So Uncool
"Footwurkin'"
Keyshia Cole – A Different Me
"This Is Us"
Kristinia DeBarge – Exposed
"Future Love"
"Speak Up"
"Sabotage"
Lemaitre – Afterglow
"Playing To Lose" feat. Stanaj
Leona Lewis – Echo
"Happy"
"Stone Hearts & Hand Grenades" (Hidden Track; Amazon Exclusive bonus track)
Liam Payne - LP1
"Live Forever" feat. Cheat Codes
Lindsey Stirling – Warmer In The Winter
"Warmer In The Winter" feat. Trombone Shorty
Livvi Franc – Livvi Franc
"Automatik"
Lizzo – Coconut Oil
"Phone"
Lizzo – Cuz I Love You
"Water Me"
Louis The Child – Last To Leave
"Last To Leave" featuring Caroline Ailin
Louis The Child – Here For Now
"Big Love" featuring EarthGang and MNDR
Lucy Walsh – Lost in the Lights
"Crash"
"Tell Her"
"Guilty"
M. Pokora – MP3
"Treason"
Madison Beer - Unbreakable
"Unbreakable"
Madison Beer - Life Support
"Emotional Bruises"
 Madonna – Rebel Heart
"Ghosttown"
"Inside Out"
Marco Mengoni – #prontoacorrere
"Non passerai"
Maya B – Real Life
"Real Life"
Methal – Cycles
"Cycles" feat. X Ambassadors
MKTO – Bad Girls
"Bad Girls"
"Afraid of the Dark"
"Monaco"
"Just Imagine It"
MKTO - MKTO
"Classic"
"Thank You"
"God Only Knows"
"American Dream"
"Forever Until Tomorrow"
"Could Be Me" feat. Ne-Yo
"Wasted"
"Heartbreak Holiday"
"Nowhere"
"No More Second Chances"
"Goodbye Song"
The Mowgli's – Waiting For The Dawn
"Say It, Just Say It"
The Mowgli's - Summertime
"Summertime"
Nick Lachey – Someone To Dance With
"Someone To Dance With"
NLT – Not Like Them
"Karma"
No Angels – Welcome to the Dance
"Shut Your Mouth"
"Up Against The Wall"
Oh Land – Oh Land
"Human"
Oh Land - Wish Bones
"Cherry on Top"
Olivia Holt – Olivia
"History"
Paris Hilton – Paris
"I Want You"
The Pussycat Dolls & A.R Rahman- Doll Domination 
 "Jai Ho! (You Are My Destiny)" ft. Nicole Scherzinger
The Pussycat Dolls - Doll Domination 2.0
"Top Of The World"
R5 – Sometime Last Night
"Lightning Strikes"
R5 – "Louder"
"Loud"
"Pass Me By"
"Forget About You"
"One Last Dance"
"Ain't No Way Were Goin Home"
"I Want U Bad"
"If I Can't Be With You"
"Love Me Like That"
"Falling For You"
"Here Comes Forever"
Rachel Platten - Wildfire
"Hey, Hey Hallelujah"
Relient K – Collapsible Lung
"Boomerang"
Rich Gains – 7 Digits
"7 Digits" (Feat. Freddie Gibbs, Nico Segal, ZZ Ward)
Rihanna – A Girl Like Me
"SOS"
Robert Delong – In The Cards
"Long Way Down"
Futures Right Here"
"Possessed"
"Guillotine"
Robert Delong - Long Way Down
"Feels Like"
"Long Way Down"
Ross Lynch – Teen Beach 2 (Original Motion Picture Soundtrack)
"On My Own"
Rozzi Crane – Never Over You
"Never Over You"
Sarah Connor – Sexy as Hell
"Fall Apart"
Sean Kingston – Sean Kingston
"Take You There"
"Dry Your Eyes"
"There's Nothin" (featuring Paula DeAnda)
"Your Sister"
"There's Nothin'" (remix); featuring Elan from The D.E.Y. and Juelz Santana
Selah Sue - Reason
Together feat. Childish Gambino
Simple Plan - Video Version
"Summer Paradise" ft. MKTO
Steve James – Warrior
"Warrior" (Feat. LIGHTS)
TOKIMONSTA – We Love
"We Love" (Feat. MNDR)
Travie McCoy – Lazarus
"After Midnight"
Varsity Fanclub – Varsity Fanclub
"Future Love"
"Lost Then Found"
 The Veronicas - Godzilla
 "High Score" 
Victoria Justice –  Victorious 3.0: Even More Music from the Hit TV Show
"Here's 2 Us"
VV Brown – Lollipops & Politics
"Children" feat. Chiddy Bang
Wallpaper. – STUPiDFACEDD
"Shotgun"
"Butt2Butt" feat. Too Short
"OKAY"
"Fucking Best Song Everrr"
Wallpaper. – Ricky Reed is Real
"WHO RLY CRS"
WayV – Awaken the World
"Domino 多米诺"
ZZ Ward – "Eleven Roses"
"Overdue"
"Got It Bad"
"Criminal"
"Cinnamon Stix"
ZZ Ward – Til The Casket Drops
"Criminal" ft. Freddie Gibbs
ZZ Ward – Love and War
"Lonely"
ZZ Ward – The Deep
"The Deep"
"The Deep" feat. Joey Purp
ZZ Ward – The Storm
"Ghost" 
"Let It Burn" 
"Help Me Mama" 
"Hold On" 
"Ride" feat. Gary Clark Jr.

Published by Evan "Kidd" Bogart

Seeker Music
Kito
Christopher Cross
 Sofia Valdes
 Katie Pearlman
 Sweetsound
 Charlie Brand
 fanclubwallet
 Kendall Brower
 Bones Owens

The Boardwalk Music Group
Ricky Reed
ZZ Ward
 Blended Babies
 Tom Peyton
 Nova Rockafeller

Camelot Music Group
Kat Dahlia
 Christian Leave
Mads Langer
 Gina Kushka
 Cleo Tighe

Crooked Paintings
MKTO
Jessica "Harlœ" Karpov
Andrew "FRND" Goldstein
Alex Chapman
Dag Lundberg

Television by Evan "Kidd" Bogart

Boardwalk Entertainment Group
Platinum Hit – Bravo
Executive Producer, Producer, Creator<ref name="celeb buzz">{{Cite web |url=http://www.celebuzz.com/2011-05-30/platinum-hit-exec-producer-evan-bogart-why-he-chose-kara-dioguardi/ |title='Celeb Buzz: Platinum Hit News |access-date=2011-10-02 |archive-url=https://web.archive.org/web/20110812081649/http://www.celebuzz.com/2011-05-30/platinum-hit-exec-producer-evan-bogart-why-he-chose-kara-dioguardi/ |archive-date=2011-08-12 |url-status=dead }}</ref>
Majors & Minors – The Hub
Executive Producer, Producer, Creator

FilmographySpinning Gold (2023) – in production
Executive Producer, Executive Music ProducerVerona (TBA) - in production
Executive Producer, Executive Music Producer

Songwriter awards
BMI Billboard'' #1's Award for "SOS" performed by Rihanna.
BMI Pop Award Top Songs of 2006 for "SOS" performed by Rihanna.
BMI Pop Award Top Songs of 2008 for "Take You There" performed by Sean Kingston.
Best Song "Halo" at the 2009 MTV Europe Music Awards.
Grammy Award Winning song "Halo" for Best Female Pop Vocal Performance 2010.
Grammy Nominated song "Halo" for Record Of The Year 2010.
BMI Pop Award Top Songs of 2009 for "Halo" performed by Beyoncé Knowles. 
Grammy Nominated song "Halo (Live)" for Best Female Pop Vocal Performance 2011
 BMI Pop Award Top Songs of 2011 for "Tonight Tonight" performed by Hot Chelle Rae
 Billboard's 40 Under 40 of 2012
 BMI Pop Award Top Songs of 2012 for "It Girl" performed by Jason Derulo
 BMI Pop Award Top Songs of 2012 for "I Like It Like That" performed by Hot Chelle Rae
 Socan Urban Music Awards Top Songs of 2013 for "Hurt Me Tomorrow" performed by K'naan
 Billboard's 40 Under 40 of 2013
 BMI Pop Award Top Songs of 2014 for "Classic" performed by MKTO

Publisher awards
 BMI Pop Award Top Songs of 2014 for "Talk Dirty" written by Ricky Reed, performed by Jason Derulo
 BMI R&B/Hip-Hop Top Songs of 2015 for "Wiggle" written by Ricky Reed, performed by Jason Derulo feat. Snoop Dogg
 BMI Pop Award Top Songs of 2016 for "No" written by Ricky Reed, performed by Meghan Trainor
 BMI Pop Award Top Songs of 2016 for "Me Too" written by Ricky Reed, performed by Meghan Trainor
 BMI Pop Award Top Songs of 2017 for "Handclap" written by Ricky Reed, performed by Fitz and the Tantrums
 BMI Pop Award Top Songs of 2018 for "Bad At Love" written by Ricky Reed, performed by Halsey
 BMI Pop Award Top Songs of 2019 for "Truth Hurts" written by Ricky Reed, performed by Lizzo

References

External links
 Interview with HitQuarters HitQuarters.com

1978 births
Living people
American music industry executives